Free Party may refer to:
 Free Party Canada
 Estonian Free Party, a political party in Estonia
 Free Party (UK), a defunct political party in the United Kingdom
 Free Party of Luxembourg a defunct political party in Luxembourg
 Free Party Salzburg

See also
Freedom Party (disambiguation)